The Coorg Legislative Assembly was a legislative body which introduced laws for Coorg State from 1950 to 1956. It had its origins in the Coorg Legislative Council established on 26 January 1924 as a representative body of the Chief Commissioner's province of Coorg. When the Constitution of India came into force on 26 January 1950, the name of the body was officially changed to Coorg Legislative Assembly. The first and only general election to the assembly took place in 1952. It was eventually dissolved in 1956 when Coorg State was merged with the neighbouring Mysore State.

History 
The Coorg Legislative Council was formed on 28 January 1924 as a representative body for the inhabitants of Coorg Province. It initially consisted of twenty members, fifteen of whom were elected and five nominated. The franchise was enlarged by the Government of India Act 1935 and the Indian Independence Act, 1947. In 1947, the number of members was reduced by two when the European constituency was abolished.

The Constitution of India replaced the legislative council with a legislative assembly consisting of 24 members from 18 constituencies, of which six were two-member constituencies and twelve were single-member constituencies. Coming into force on 26 January 1950, one election was held to the assembly, in 1952.

Members of the Coorg Legislative Assembly, 1952 
Candidates of only two political parties Indian National Congress (INC) and Communist Party of India (CPI) contested the elections. Many other candidates contested as Independents such as the independence activist Pandyanda Belliappa.

References

Further reading
 Bopanna, P. T. The Rise and Fall of the Coorg State, 2009
 Muthanna, I. M. Coorg Memoirs, 1971

Coorg
Historical state legislatures in India